Sömmerda station is the station of  Sömmerda in the German state of Thuringia. It is the public transport hub of the Sömmerda district and the only Turmbahnhof ("tower station"—two-level interchange station) in Thuringia.

History
The first railway reached Sömmerda on 14 August 1874. It was the Straußfurt–Großheringen railway (known as the Pfefferminzbahn—"Peppermint Railway"), which connects Straußfurt in the west via Sömmerda to Großheringen in the east. This line was built by the Nordhausen-Erfurt Railway Company (Nordhausen-Erfurter Eisenbahn-Gesellschaft) and owned by the Prussian state railways (Preußische Staatsbahn) from 1887. On 24 October 1881, the second and more important line, the Sangerhausen–Erfurt railway was opened through Sömmerda. In preparation for it, the station had to be developed into a two-level interchange station in order to link both lines. Since then, the higher Sangerhausen–Erfurt railway has run above the Peppermint Railway. This line served the traffic from Erfurt to the then capital of the Prussian Province of Saxony, Magdeburg. It was built by the Magdeburg–Halberstadt Railway Company (Magdeburg-Halberstädter Eisenbahngesellschaft) and was taken over by the Prussian government in 1886. A second track was built between Erfurt and Sömmerda. The second track was dismantled in 1946 to provide reparations, but was restored after the reunification of Germany. The line was electrified by the end of the 1990s. Passenger traffic on the Straußfurt–Sömmerda section ended on 9 December 2007 and Regionalbahn services now run on the Peppermint Railway only to Großheringen.

Infrastructure

Platforms
There is barrier-free access to platform 1 via a ramp and to platform 2/3 (island platform) via a lift. Platforms 4 and 5 are partly barrier-free as platform 5 can only be reached by a pedestrian overpass.

Regional services
In the 2017 timetable, Sömmerda is served by the following services:
RE 10 Erfurt–Sömmerda–Sangerhausen–Güsten–Magdeburg (every two hours alternating with RB 59)
RB 27 Sömmerda–Buttstädt–Großheringen (hourly between Sömmerda and Buttstädt, otherwise every two hours)
RB 59 Erfurt–Sömmerda–Sangerhausen–Halle (Saale)–Bitterfeld (every two hours alternating with RE 10)

References

Railway stations in Thuringia
Railway stations in Germany opened in 1874
Buildings and structures in Sömmerda (district)